The litl webbook is a webbook developed, marketed, and sold by litl LLC.  It features the ability to stand upright in an inverted-V position (referred to as "easel mode") and a cloud-based operating system called litl OS.

Origins
Litl's CEO John Chuang, also co-founder of Aquent, has said that the origins of the litl webbook lay in his observation that while his family was increasingly using web applications, their home computer was based on pre-web.

Engineering partners
The industrial design of the Litl webbook was by Fuseproject with engineering design by MOTO Development Group.   FIC manufactures the device.

Operating system

Litl OS is the cloud-oriented operating environment of the Litl webbook.

User interface philosophy
The litl OS interface removes several conventional elements of general-purpose desktop environments.
Litl state that a set of principles were developed to guide the design of the interface, including using a rule that any computer task that had the word "management" next to it was removed.

User interface structure
Litl OS's user interface utilizes graphic elements called "cards" to organize browsing sessions and content instead of the tabs and menus found on conventional desktops:

Flicking through cards in Easel mode (when the screen is flipped back on itself causing the webbook to be in an A-frame position) is done using a blue-colored click-wheel (called the "litl wheel") on the litl webbook or remote control.

The card concept, easel mode and general usage of the interface are demonstrated in Litl's videos.

The interfaces to some web content are also customized by Litl or third parties to integrate with Litl OS and are referred to as litl channels.  (Litl OS's optional display method for RSS feeds is also referred to as a "litl channel").  Customizations and settings are minimal in keeping with the design goals of simplicity and ease of use.

Designers
User interface concepts were first mapped out by Pentagram working closely with Litl.  Personas and detailed interaction design were by Cooper Consulting in consultation with Litl's internal design team. Fort Franklin also contributed to some design elements.

Software details
The underlying operating system is a mobile/embedded distribution of Ubuntu provided by Canonical.  The user interface is written largely in Mozilla's dialect of Javascript using the gjs binding to access GNOME and Clutter UI elements. Litl automatically performs nightly software updates, and the OS stores browser cards, web channels, settings, and contacts online at Amazon S3 using a web service running on Google's App Engine and the Django framework. Open source components of the operating system's source code can be obtained on DVD from Litl.

Specifications

See also

 Webbook
 Netbook

References

External links
FCC: OET Exhibits List
 Internal photographs (PDF)
 External photographs (PDF)
 Dec 31, 2008 - engadget: FIC's 10.4-inch CW001 Mini-note splashes down in FCC database
 Oct 28, 2009 - engadget: Litl Easel 'web computer' is cute as a baby-blue button
 Notebookcheck
 Netbookchoice
 Netbooked
 First thoughts on litl's Easel
 Cooper Consulting

Netbooks